Bloed, Sweet & Trane is Van Coke Kartel's fifth studio album. It was released in October 2013, and produced by Springbok Nude Girls' guitarist Theo Crous.

Track listing

References

Van Coke Kartel albums